The 1980 Warner W. Hodgdon 400 was a NASCAR Winston Cup Series racing event that took place on June 8, 1980, at Riverside International Raceway in Riverside, California. The Sharon Hodgdon 200 for Grand American Stock cars was run the same day as this race. Ron Esau was the winner, Roy Smith was second Ray Elder third. 

By 1980, NASCAR had completely stopped tracking the year model of all the vehicles and most teams did not take stock cars to the track under their own power anymore. Only manual transmission vehicles were allowed to participate in this race; a policy that NASCAR has retained to the present day. Road courses were one of the more attractive features for NASCAR during the 1980 Winston Cup Series season. NASCAR would develop a liking for tracks with a lap duration of a mile and a half by the 2014 NASCAR Sprint Cup Series season.

The NASCAR Winston Cup Series was also plagued with top teams running big engines and finishing in third place to avoid inspection around the time that this race was held.

Race report
Darrell Waltrip would beat Neil Bonnett by less than half a second in front of 18000 fans in attendance; getting the season sweep at the Riverside road course. There were 18 different changes in the first-place position while there would be five different caution periods for 15 laps. Cale Yarborough would qualify for the pole position with a qualifying speed of  while the average speed of the race would be . Cecil Gordon would earn his last top-ten finish at this race. Other famous drivers who raced here included: Richard Petty, Cale Yarborough, Dale Earnhardt, Bobby Allison, Terry Labonte, and Richard Childress (now the owner of Richard Childress Racing).

D.K. Ulrich would finish last in the race due to an engine issue on the pace laps of this 95-lap race.  He would make $1,000 just for qualifying ($ when adjusted for inflation) while Waltrip went home with an extra $22,100 in his bank account ($ when adjusted for inflation). Notable crew chiefs who were actively participating in this race included Junie Donlavey, Joey Arrington, Darel Dieringer, Darrell Bryant, Dale Inman, Bud Moore, Kirk Shelmerdine among others.

The race was named after famous race team owner/sponsor, owner of 12 race tracks, local city redeveloper, and philanthropist Warner Hodgdon.

Roy Smith was the only Canadian to appear in a 36-driver grid of mostly American-born competitors. J.D. McDuffie tallies his third and final top-10 of the season, all of being ninth-place runs. Smith would drive for NASCAR team owner Robert Beadle.

Don Waterman would make his NASCAR Winston Cup Series debut at this race.

The only known DNQ for the race was Gene Thoensen; an independent driver who was the driver of the unsponsored No. 77 machine.

Qualifying

Top 20 finishers

Standings after the race

References

Warner W. Hodgdon 400
Warner W. Hodgdon 400
NASCAR races at Riverside International Raceway